John 20:18 is the eighteenth verse of the twentieth chapter of the Gospel of John in the New Testament. It occurs after Jesus' resurrection and appearance to Mary Magdalene. In the previous verse Jesus has given Mary a message to deliver to his disciples, this verse describes how she delivers it.

Content
The original Koine Greek, according to the Textus Receptus, reads:

In the King James Version of the Bible it is translated as:
Mary Magdalene came and told the disciples that she had seen the Lord, and that he had spoken these things unto her.

The modern World English Bible translates the passage as:
Mary Magdalene came and told the disciples that she had seen the Lord, and that he had said these things to her.

For a collection of other versions see BibleHub John 20:18

Analysis
The account given in the Gospel of John differs from those in the Gospels of Matthew, Mark, and Luke, while all four describe the meeting between Mary and the disciples, and mention other appearances by Jesus. In Mark 16:7 and Matthew 28:7 the angel(s) give the women the task to inform the disciples concerning Jesus' later appearance in Galilee, whereas in Luke 24:33 the two disciples from Emmaus return to Jerusalem to inform the eleven, but in John, Mary Magdalene is the one reporting both her meeting with Jesus and his message. That it was Mary who was sent to tell the disciples of the resurrection is considered by some scholars to reflect the central importance of Mary, leading Saint Augustine, for instance, to call Mary the "Apostle to the Apostles." When reporting her experience, Mary was more concerned about her meeting with Jesus than with the message regarding the ascension.

John does not record how the disciples responded Mary's message, but it can be assumed that the reaction may not be any better than when they heard the women's report about the empty tomb.

References

Sources

External links
John Calvin's commentary on John 20:16-18
Jesus Appears to His Disciples

20:18
John 20:18